The 27th General Assembly of Nova Scotia represented Nova Scotia between 1878 and 1882.

E.T. Moseley was chosen as speaker for the house.

The assembly was dissolved on May 23, 1882.

List of Members 

Notes:

References 
 

Terms of the General Assembly of Nova Scotia
1878 establishments in Nova Scotia
1882 disestablishments in Nova Scotia